The 1990–91 rugby union Scottish Inter-District Championship

1990-91 League Table

Results

Round 1

Round 2

Round 3

Round 4

Round 5

Matches outwith the Championship

Trial matches

Blues: 

Reds:

References

1990–91 in Scottish rugby union
1990-91
Scot